Skuta is the third-highest peak in the Kamnik Alps and is known for the Skuta Glacier, which is the easternmost glacier in the Alps. A mountain lodge, operated by the Ljubljana Matica Alpine Club, stands below Skuta.

Name
Although the Slovene common noun skuta refers to a ricotta-like cheese, there is no evidence that this word is the source of the mountain's name.

References

External links

 Skuta on hribi.net Route Description and Photos (slo)
 Skuta on SummitPost.org

Mountains of the Kamnik–Savinja Alps
Mountains of Upper Carniola
Two-thousanders of Slovenia